Grzegorz Żmija (born November 27, 1971) is a football goalkeeper from Poland playing currently for Polonia Bytom. He debuted in Orange Ekstraklasa in the age of 36.

References

1971 births
Living people
People from Zgorzelec
Polish footballers
Śląsk Świętochłowice players
Polonia Bytom players
Sportspeople from Lower Silesian Voivodeship

Association football goalkeepers